Enrico Benzing (born 17 June 1932) is an Italian engineer and journalist, son of the writer Mario Benzing.

He wrote for the daily newspaper La Gazzetta dello Sport as Motoring-Editor and Formula One races reporter. Since 1974 he writes for Il Giornale, created by Indro Montanelli, with technical contributions about the Formula One races. In 1963 he won the first edition of the "Dino Ferrari" Prize. From 1978 to 1980 he represented Italy in the Technical Commission of the Fédération Internationale de l'Automobile. He has projected wings for race cars, also Formula One, and he has published twelve books: among them, monographs about single cars, treatises about engine-technology, aerodynamics and the relations between aerodynamics and power in the race-cars.

Selective Bibliography
 Motori da corsa, Roma, 1968
 Rennmotoren im Examen. Triebwerktechnik und -Funktion, Stuttgart, 1973
 Ian Bamsey, Enrico Benzing, Mike Lawrence, Allan Staniforth, The 1000 BHP Grand Prix Cars, London, 1988
 Ferrari Formula 1, Catalogue raisonné 1948-1988, Milano, 1988
 Ferrari Formula 1 Annual, Milano, 1989
 Ferrari Formula 1 Annual 1990, Milano, 1990
 Ferrari Formula 1 Annual 1991, Milano, 1991
 Ali / Wings. Studio per tecnici e piloti di auto da corsa. Study for Racing Car Engineers and Drivers, Milano, 1992
 Dall'aerodinamica alla potenza in Formula 1. Mezzo secolo di motori in analisi, Milano, 2004
 Formula 1. Evoluzione, tecnica, regolamento, Milano, 2010
 Ali / Wings. Progettazione e applicazione su auto da corsa. Their design and application to racing cars, Milano, 2012

External links
The complete bibliography
Quotation in www.research-racing.de 
Quotation in the Ilmor Page in www.de.wikipedia
Recension in www.f1.sk
Quotation by Coimbra University
Quotation in www.szabadban.hu
Recension in www.origo.hu
Recension in www.formule1.auto-news.cz
Quotation in www.f1total.com 
About the Author and Jack Brabham

1932 births
Formula One journalists and reporters
Italian automotive engineers
Italian motoring journalists
Living people
Italian motorsport people
Italian sports journalists
20th-century Italian journalists
Italian male journalists
21st-century Italian journalists
20th-century Italian male writers